The following lists events that happened during 1892 in New Zealand.

Incumbents

Regal and viceregal
Head of State – Queen Victoria
Governor – The term of The Earl of Onslow ends on 25 February. David Boyle, 7th Earl of Glasgow become Governor from 6 June.

Government and law
The 11th New Zealand Parliament continues with the Liberal Party in power.

Speaker of the House – William Steward
Prime Minister – John Ballance
Minister of Finance —John Ballance
Chief Justice – Hon Sir James Prendergast

Parliamentary opposition
Leader of the Opposition –  William Rolleston (Independent).

Main centre leaders
Mayor of Auckland – William Crowther
Mayor of Christchurch – Charles Gray followed by William Prudhoe
Mayor of Dunedin – Charles Robert Chapman followed by Charles Haynes
Mayor of Wellington – Francis Bell

Events

Arts and literature

Music

Sport

Athletics
6 February John H. 'Jack' Hempton equals the World Record for the 100-yard dash with a time of 9.8 seconds at Lancaster Park in Christchurch.
A 5-man team competes in England and France.

National champions (Men)
100 yards – Jack Hempton (Hawkes Bay)
250 yards – Jack Hempton (Hawkes Bay)
440 yards – Peter Wood (Canterbury)
880 yards – J. Grierson (Canterbury)
1 mile – William Burk (Otago)
3 miles – Derisley Wood (Canterbury)
120 yards hurdles – W. Moir (Canterbury)
440 yards hurdles – Harold Batger (Wellington)
Long jump – T. Upfill (Auckland)
High jump – F. Meyrick (Canterbury)
Pole vault – W. West (Canterbury)
Shot put – Timothy O’Connor (Auckland)

Billiards
The first firm in the country to manufacture tables begins in Wellington. The sport has been played in the country for the previous decade.

Chess
National Champion: F.V. Siedeberg of Dunedin.

Horse racing

Harness racing
 Auckland Trotting Cup (over 3 miles) is won by Little Ben

Thoroughbred racing
 New Zealand Cup – St Hippo
 New Zealand Derby – Stepniak
 Auckland Cup – St Hippo
 Wellington Cup – Cynisca

Season leaders (1891/92)
 Leading flat jockey – T. Redmond

Lawn bowls
National Champions:
Singles – W. Carswell (Taieri)
Fours – N. Fleming, J. Familton, B. Mollison and J. Martin (skip) (Oamaru)

Polo
Savile Cup winners – Christchurch

Rowing
There are now 34 rowing clubs in New Zealand.

National champions (Men)
Single sculls – M. Keefe (Auckland)
Double sculls – Wellington
Coxless pairs – Star
Coxed fours – Canterbury

Rugby union
Provincial club rugby champions include:
see also :Category:Rugby union in New Zealand

Shooting
Ballinger Belt – Sergeant Doughty (A Battery)

Soccer
Provincial Champions:
Auckland: Alliance Auckland
Wellington: Queen's Park Wellington

Swimming
National champions (Men)
100 yards freestyle – H. Bailey (Auckland)
220 yards freestyle – H. Bailey (Auckland)
440 yards freestyle – H. Bailey (Auckland)
880 yards freestyle – H. Bailey (Auckland)

Tennis
National championships
Men's singles – Richard Harman
Women's singles – D. Douslin
Men's doubles – M. Fenwicke and F. Logan
Women's doubles – E. Harman and J. Rees

Births
 27 January: Henry Ashton "Harry" Highet, engineer, designer of the P class yacht.
 2 June: Cedric Stanton Hicks, nutrition expert.
 11 June: William Duncan, rugby union player.
 13 July: Bertie Victor Cooksley, politician.
 15 August: Abraham Wachner, 35th Mayor of Invercargill.

Deaths
 12 March - Paora Tuhaere, Māori leader (born c1825). 
 24 May – Douglas Hastings Macarthur, politician (born 1839).
 28 June - Harry Atkinson, politician and premier (born 1831).
 12 November - Joseph Ward, Marlborough politician (born 1817). 
 10 December - Arthur Atkinson, politician (born 1833).

See also
List of years in New Zealand
Timeline of New Zealand history
History of New Zealand
Military history of New Zealand
Timeline of the New Zealand environment
Timeline of New Zealand's links with Antarctica

References
General
 Romanos, J. (2001) New Zealand Sporting Records and Lists. Auckland: Hodder Moa Beckett. 
Specific

External links